Diagnostic and Interventional Cardiology is a trade magazine catering to cardiologists and cath labs.

History and profile
Diagnostic and Interventional Cardiology was launched by Chilton Publishing in Philadelphia in 1961. In 1975 it was sold to Reilly Communications Group. The magazine is owned by Scranton Gillette Communications. Its focus is on interventional cardiology, a branch of cardiology that uses catheter-based treatment to deal with structural heart disease. The magazine provides information about developments in this field and is a notable publication within the healthcare industry. The magazine was the recipient of American Society of Healthcare Publication Editors award in 2013.

The magazine had 26,242 subscribers to its print edition in July 2013. Melinda Taschetta-Millane is its editorial director.

References

External links 
 Diagnostic and Interventional Cardiology
 Scranton Gillette website

Business magazines published in the United States
Cardiology journals
Magazines established in 1961
Magazines published in Chicago
Professional and trade magazines
Magazines published in Philadelphia
Health magazines